Ove Fundin (born 23 May 1933) is a Swedish former professional motorcycle speedway rider. He competed in the Speedway World Championships from 1951 to 1970. Fundin is notable for winning the Speedway World Championship Final five times (1956, 1960, 1961, 1963, 1967), a record bettered only by Ivan Mauger and fellow Swede Tony Rickardsson who each won six World Championships. He finished runner-up in the championship 3 times (1957–59) and was third in 1962, 1964 and 1965 meaning that from his first win in 1956 until his last in 1967, Fundin did not finish lower than a podium place in a record eleven World Finals. He was known by the nickname of the "Flying Fox" or just "the Fox" because of his red hair. In 2013, Fundin was named an FIM Legend for his motorcycling achievements.

Career
Fundin was born in Tranås. It was suggested to him by Australian champion Aub Lawson that he ride in Britain and he joined the Norwich Stars, riding for them from 1955 until 1964 when the Firs stadium closed. Then he rode for Long Eaton 1966, Belle Vue 1967, Wembley 1970 but will always be remembered for the glory days at Norwich Stars where he was worshiped by the home fans.

He made a total of 15 World Final appearances coming runner-up three times and third three times as well as his five wins. He also helped Sweden win the World Team Cup in 1960, 1962, 1963, 1964, 1967 and 1970 as well as the Speedway World Pairs Championship in 1968. He is considered to being one of the greatest riders of all time (along with the likes of Ivan Mauger and Hans Nielsen) and this is reflected by the Speedway World Cup being named after him. Fundin went through the World Team Cup (including qualifying rounds and the final in Gothenburg) undefeated in 1960, a feat not matched until Australia's Jason Crump went through the 2001 Speedway World Cup undefeated.

Fundin also made several visits to Australia during his career with considerable success. Along with representing Sweden and various "Rest of the World" teams in Test Matches against the Australians, he won the South Australian Championship four times (1966, 1967, 1969, 1970) at the Rowley Park Speedway in Adelaide, and the Western Australian Championship at the Claremont Speedway in Perth in 1969.

He won a record nine Swedish Championships.

Fundin received the Svenska Dagbladet Gold Medal in 1961 (shared with Sten Lundin).

After retirement
Fundin was honoured as a Freeman of the City of Norwich in 2006, only the second non-English person to be awarded this honour. The ceremony was completed at Norwich City Hall Council chamber by the Lord Mayor of Norwich on October 30, 2006.

He currently lives on the French Riviera.

World Final appearances

Individual World Championship
 1954 -  London, Wembley Stadium - 16th - 2pts
 1955 -  London, Wembley Stadium - 6th - 10pts
 1956 -  London, Wembley Stadium - Winner - 13pts
 1957 -  London, Wembley Stadium - 2nd - 14pts + 2pts
 1958 -  London, Wembley Stadium - 2nd - 13pts
 1959 -  London, Wembley Stadium - 2nd - 13pts
 1960 -  London, Wembley Stadium - Winner - 14pts + 3pts
 1961 -  Malmö, Malmö Stadion - Winner - 14pts
 1962 -  London, Wembley Stadium - 3rd - 10pts + 3pts
 1963 -  London, Wembley Stadium - Winner - 14pts
 1964 -  Gothenburg, Ullevi - 3rd - 13pts + 2pts
 1965 -  London, Wembley Stadium - 3rd - 13pts + 2pts
 1967 -  London, Wembley Stadium - Winner - 14pts + 3pts
 1968 -  Gothenburg, Ullevi - 9th - 7pts
 1969 -  London, Wembley Stadium - 7th - 9pts

World Pairs Championship
 1968* -  Kempten (with Torbjörn Harrysson) - Winner - 24pts (14)
 1969* -  Stockholm, Gubbängens IP (with Göte Nordin) - 2nd - 27pts (15)
 1970 -  Malmö, Malmö Stadion (with Bengt Jansson) - 2nd - 25pts (15)
* Unofficial World Championships.

World Team Cup
 1960 -  Gothenburg, Ullevi (with Olle Nygren / Rune Sörmander / Björn Knutsson) - Winner - 44pts (12)
 1961 -  Wrocław, Olympic Stadium (with Sören Sjösten / Rune Sörmander / Björn Knutsson / Per Tage Svensson) - 2nd - 30pts (11)
 1962 -  Slaný (with Björn Knutsson / Sören Sjösten / Göte Nordin / Rune Sörmander) - Winner - 36pts (9)
 1963 -  Vienna, Stadion Wien (with Björn Knutsson / Per Olof Söderman / Göte Nordin / Rune Sörmander) - Winner - 37pts (7)
 1964 -  Abensberg, Abensberg Stadion (with Björn Knutsson / Göte Nordin / Rune Sörmander / Sören Sjösten) - Winner - 34pts (6)
 1965 -  Kempten (with Björn Knutsson / Bengt Jansson / Göte Nordin) - 2nd - 23pts (8)
 1966 -  Wrocław, Olympic Stadium (with Björn Knutsson / Leif Enecrona / Göte Nordin / Leif Larsson) - 3rd - 22pts (2)
 1967 -  Malmö, Malmö Stadion (with Göte Nordin / Bengt Jansson / Torbjörn Harrysson) - Winner - 32pts (6)
 1968 -  London, Wembley Stadium (with Bengt Jansson / Anders Michanek / Olle Nygren / Torbjörn Harrysson) - 2nd - 30pts (11)
 1969 -  Rybnik, Rybnik Municipal Stadium (with Bengt Jansson / Sören Sjösten / Anders Michanek / Torbjörn Harrysson) - 4th - 12pts (2)
 1970 -  London, Wembley Stadium (with Bengt Jansson / Anders Michanek / Sören Sjösten) - Winner - 42pts (11)

World Longtrack Championship

 1959 - Semi-final
 1961 -  Oslo (Second)
 1962 -  Mühldorf (12th)
 1966 - Qualifying Round

Nordic Longtrack Champion
 1963

External links
 http://grasstrackgb.co.uk/ove-fundin/

References

1933 births
Living people
Swedish speedway riders
Individual Speedway World Champions
Speedway World Pairs Champions
Belle Vue Aces riders
Wembley Lions riders
Norwich Stars riders
Long Eaton Archers riders
Individual Speedway Long Track World Championship riders
People from Tranås Municipality
Sportspeople from Jönköping County